Heunginjimun, literally "Gate of Rising Benevolence" or more commonly known as Dongdaemun, is one of The Eight Gates of Seoul in the Fortress Wall of Seoul, a prominent landmark in central Seoul, South Korea. The Korean name "Dongdaemun" means "Great East Gate," and it was so named because it was the major eastern gate in the wall that surrounded Seoul during the Joseon Dynasty.  The gate is located at Jongno 6-ga in Jongno-gu.

History
The structure was first built by King Taejo during his fifth year of reign (1398). It was renovated in 1453, and the current structure is the one rebuilt in 1869.

In August 2011, the roof of the gate was partially damaged by record rainfall. The large amount of rain resulted in chipping of the roof's ridge. An official of the Cultural Heritage Administration stated that "The aged gate underwent repairs in 1998 and seems to have become soaked in heavy rains".

Characteristics

Heunginjimun shows architectural style of the late Joseon period. The most unusual characteristic is its built outer wall, Ongseong. Ongseong was constructed to compensate the weakness of the target from multiple invaders. It protects the gate and is a beautiful addition.

Construction of the Dongdaemun Design Plaza, a major urban development landmark designed by Zaha Hadid, started in 2009 to renovate what used to be Dongdaemun Stadium (an amateur baseball park) and was officially inaugurated on March 21, 2014. This landmark, also called the DDP, is the centerpiece of South Korea's fashion hub and popular tourist destination and has been one of the main reasons for Seoul's designation as World Design Capital in 2010.

Location of the Gate

Heunginjimun is located at the intersection of subway lines 1 and 4, at Dongdaemun Station (동대문역). The gate is within easy reach of exit 1 or exits 6–10 of this station.

Images

See also
Dongdaemun Station
List of upscale shopping districts

References

 Dongdaemun street videoclip

Buildings and structures completed in 1398
Buildings and structures in Jongno District
Gates in South Korea
Tourist attractions in Seoul
Treasures of South Korea
History of Seoul